In enzymology, a m7G(5')pppN diphosphatase is an enzyme that catalyzes the chemical reaction

7-methylguanosine 5'-triphospho-5'-polynucleotide + H2O  7-methylguanosine 5'-phosphate + polynucleotide

Thus, the two substrates of this enzyme are 7-methylguanosine 5'-triphospho-5'-polynucleotide and H2O, whereas its two products are 7-methylguanosine 5'-phosphate and polynucleotide.

This is the enzyme involved in the processing of amphetamines of the cathinone group, including mephedrone and khat.

This enzyme belongs to the family of hydrolases, specifically those acting on acid anhydrides in phosphorus-containing anhydrides.  The systematic name of this enzyme class is 7-methylguanosine-5'-triphospho-5'-polynucleotide 7-methylguanosine-5'-phosphohydrolase. Other names in common use include decapase, and m7G(5')pppN pyrophosphatase.

See also
 7-Methylguanosine

References

 
 
 

EC 3.6.1
Enzymes of unknown structure